Stefan Ilzhöfer (born 22 March 1995) is a German professional basketball player who formerly played for the Frankfurt Skyliners of the European Basketball Champions League and the German League Basketball Bundesliga.

He currently plays for Rostock Seawolves. Before he joined the Seawolves, he played for Gladiators Trier.

References

External links
Basketball Champions League Profile
Skyliners Frankfurt Profile
Eurobasket.com Profile

1995 births
German men's basketball players
Living people
People from Kirchheim unter Teck
Sportspeople from Stuttgart (region)
Rostock Seawolves players
Skyliners Frankfurt players
Small forwards
21st-century German people